The Angolan girdled lizard (Cordylus angolensis), also known as the Angolan spiny-tailed lizard, is a species of lizard in the genus Cordylus. The species is endemic to Angola, as its names testify, and is ovoviviparous.

Reproduction
C. angolensis is ovoviviparous, meaning females keep eggs inside their bodies until ready to hatch.

References

Further reading
Bocage JVB. 1895. Herpétologie d'Angola et du Congo. Lisbon: Ministère de la Marine et des Colonies. (Imprimerie nationale, printer). xx + 203 pp. + Plates I-XIX. (Zonurus angolensis, new species, pp. 24–25). (in French).

Endemic fauna of Angola
Cordylus
Reptiles of Angola
Reptiles described in 1895
Taxa named by José Vicente Barbosa du Bocage